Abramov (Abramnar aalı) is a rural locality (an aul) in Askizsky District, Khakassia, Russia. The population was 59 as of 2010. There is 1 street.

Geography 
Abramov is located 37 km southwest of Askiz (the district's administrative centre) by road. Poltakov is the nearest rural locality.

References 

Rural localities in Khakassia